The blue-spotted salamander (Ambystoma laterale) is a mole salamander native to the Great Lakes states and northeastern United States, and parts of Ontario and Quebec in Canada. Their range is known to extend to James Bay to the north, and southeastern Manitoba to the west.

Description
Their skin is bluish-black, with characteristic blue and white flecks on its back, and bluish-white spots on the sides of its body and tail. They have elongated bodies. The vent is typically black, which contrasts with the paler belly. Larvae that have transformed may have yellow splotches; these turn blue once the individual becomes terrestrial. Occasionally, a melanistic individual may be found in the wild.

They have long toes: four on the front feet and five on the hind feet. Typically, specimens will have 12–14 costal grooves. Males tend to be smaller than females, though they have longer, flattened tails.

Habitat
Blue-spotted salamanders are primarily found in moist, deciduous hardwood forests and swampy woodlands, though they can be found in coniferous forests and fields too. They prefer vernal pools that retain water into mid-summer, to ensure access to a suitable breeding habitat. Underbrush, leaf litter, rocks and logs are commonly used for shelter. Studies are beginning to show that habitat selection may also be affected by factors such as light pollution and chemical hues.

Reproduction
Eggs are laid in small agglomerations attached to twigs, rocks or plants at the edge of a woodland pond or ditch. Clutches average a dozen eggs, and females may lay up to 500 eggs yearly. Males and females first mate when two years old. Breeding occurs in early spring near vernal pools.

Eggs take about one month to hatch. At hatching, larvae have a well-developed mouth and eyes. Front limbs form at two weeks, and hind limbs form at three weeks. It will fully transform to its terrestrial state by late summer.

Blue-spotted salamanders are known to be associated with unisexual (all-female) populations of ancient origin. The unisexual females often look like blue-spotted salamanders but have hybrid genomes and require sperm from a co-occurring, related species to fertilize their eggs and initiate development. Usually the eggs then discard the sperm genome and develop asexually (i.e., gynogenesis, with premeiotic doubling); however, they may incorporate the genome from the sperm into the resulting offspring. Sperm incorporation commonly takes the form of genome addition (resulting in ploidy elevation in the offspring), or genome replacement, wherein one of the maternal genomes is discarded. This unique mode of reproduction has been termed kleptogenesis by Bogart and his colleagues.

Relationship with Tremblay's salamander 
Female Tremblay's salamanders (Ambystoma tremblayi) breed with male blue-spotted salamanders from March to April. Eggs are laid singly or in small masses of 6 to 10 eggs on debris at pond bottom. The males' chromosome contribution only stimulates the egg's development; its genetic material is ignored.

References

 IUCN RangeMap
 Scientific and Common Names of the Reptiles and Amphibians of North America Explained
 Brodman, R. (2005). Ambystoma laterale, Blue-spotted Salamander, pp 614–616. In: Amphibian Declines: The Conservation Status of United States Species. M. Lannoo, (ed.), University of California Press, Berkeley. Ambystoma laterale species account and conservation status

External links
Blue Spotted Salamander (Ambystoma laterale), Natural Resources Canada

Mole salamanders
Amphibians of Canada
Amphibians of the United States
Fauna of the Great Lakes region (North America)
Fauna of the Eastern United States
Fauna of the Northeastern United States
Extant Pleistocene first appearances
Amphibians described in 1856